The Haryana state of north India has 2 National Parks, 8 Wildlife Sanctuaries, 2 Wildlife Conservation Areas, 4 Animal & Bird Breeding Centers, 1 Deer park and 50 herbal parks which are managed by the Forests Department, Haryana of the Government of Haryana. Wildlife and forest areas of Haryana lies mainly in the foothills of Shivalik hills range in the north and Aravalli hill range in the South Haryana. Aravalli mountains in Haryana are part of the Sariska to Delhi leopard wildlife corridor (including "Western-southern Haryana spur" which entails Satnali-Dadam-Tosha hill (ranges).

Differences Between Types of Protected Wildlife Areas in Haryana
Hunting and poaching is illegal in all protected wildlife areas.

All rights of people within a National Park have to be resettled outside while rights over land can be allowed inside a Sanctuary. Grazing of livestock can be permitted inside a Sanctuary but not inside a National Park. A Sanctuary can be upgraded as a National Park. However a National Park cannot be downgraded as a Sanctuary. Wildlife National Parks, Sanctuaries and Conservation areas must remain free of roads, buildings, motorized equipment and mechanical transport.

National parks of Haryana
The Forests Department, Haryana of the Government of Haryana maintains 2 National parks:

Wildlife Sanctuaries of Haryana
The Forests Department, Haryana of the Government of Haryana maintains the following Wildlife Sanctuaries:

Conservation Areas of Haryana

Animal & Bird Breeding Centers of Haryana
The Forests Department, Haryana of the Government of Haryana runs the following:

Deer Parks of Haryana
The Forests Department, Haryana of the Government of Haryana runs one deer park:

Herbal Parks of Haryana

Forests Department, Haryana of Government of Haryana has 59 herbal parks

 Chandan Vatika Herbal Park, Jind   - DC Colony near Red Cross Office on Gohana Road Jind City, Haryana

 Shatavar Vatika Herbal Park, Hisar - Asparagus racemosus'' herbal park near Deer Park, Hisar on Hisar-Dhansu Road in Bir Hisar (बिड़ हिसार), Hisar, Haryana
 Ch. Surender Singh Memorial Herbal Park, Tosham, on Hisar-Bhiwani road in Tosham, Bhiwani district
 Ch. Surender Singh Memorial Herbal Park, Kairu, on Bahal-Bhiwani road in Kairu village near Bahal in Bhiwani district. Kairu village is also the location of Chinkara Breeding Centre Kairu, Bhiwani
 Ch. Devi Lal Herbal Nature Park, Tajewal, Yamuna Nagar district, location map, co-ord: 30°16'14"N 77°29'11"E

Zoos and safaris
 Mini Zoo, Bhiwani
 Rohtak Zoo within Tilyar Lake complex
 Mini Zoo & Black Buck Breeding Centre, Pipli
 Gurugram leopard and deer safari, proposed in 1000 acre city forest near sector 76 at Sakatpur and Garat Pur Bas villages in Aravalli hills of Gurugram, in September 2019 panchayat had already approved the transfer of panchayat common land to the wildlife department. See also Northern Aravalli leopard and wildlife corridor and Leopards of Haryana.

Other Potential Wildlife Sanctuaries & Conservation Areas of Haryana
Important wetland, water sheds and forested areas of Haryana

 Blue Bird Lake at Hisar (city), the location map.
 Bhakra Dam
 Bawal HSIDC wetland
 Dhosi Hill 
 Nuh and Ferozepur Jhirka hill forest 
 Hathni Kund Barrage
 Kaushalya Dam at Pinjore in Panchkula district on Kaushalya river.
 Madhogarh hill forest
 Masani barrage wetland
 Tajewala Barrage
 Surajkund forest

See also 

 List of zoos in India
 List of national parks of India
 Wildlife sanctuaries of India 
 List of Monuments of National Importance in Haryana
 List of State Protected Monuments in Haryana
 List of Indus Valley Civilization sites
 Tosham rock inscription
 Haryana Tourism
 Divisions of Haryana

References

External links 

 List of National Parks, State Wild Life Sanctuaries, Zoos and Parks in Haryana

Haryana
Protected areas of Haryana
Lists of tourist attractions in Haryana